Carl Daenzer [In Germany, Karl] (July 17, 1820 in Odenheim – September 23, 1906 in Neckarsulm) founded the  and was a long-time editor of the , two noted German-language newspapers in St. Louis, Missouri. He and Emil Preetorius were the Nestors of the German American press in the United States.

In the Revolutions of 1848 in Germany, Daenzer had made himself obnoxious to the German government with efforts to bring about German unity by force of arms. For his rebellious course, he was condemned to ten years imprisonment with a heavy fine. He escaped to Switzerland, and thence to the United States.

Daenzer edited the paper until 1857 when, due to differences of various kinds which had arisen with Boernstein, he resigned.

The initial investment was comparatively small, $1,275, but the paper paid its way from the beginning. It did business under the firm name of Daenzer & Wenzel. Wenzel sold his part in 1859, and Daenzer left the paper in 1860 due to health reasons.

In 1870 [Franco-Prussian War] he collected more than one million Dollars for wounded German soldiers.
In 1885 President Cleveland asked him as US-ambassador to Bern (Suisse). But he refused.

When Daenzer returned to St. Louis in 1862 after having left for Europe in 1860, he found that the Anzeiger had gone out of business. After a time, the word "" (new) was dropped. Although in the main supporting Democratic measures, the chief quality of the ''' was its complete independence.

He spent his retirement years in Germany.

Legacy
A statue, Naked Truth was erected in St. Louis in memory of Daenzer and two others who worked on the '', Carl Schurz and Emil Preetorius.

In 1870, a Carl Daenzer, perhaps the same person, released 20 Eurasian tree sparrows from Germany into Lafayette Park in St. Louis.

References

 
 
 Obituary in The New York Times
 The Eurasian Tree Sparrow at mdc.mo.gov
 

1820 births
1906 deaths
People from Karlsruhe (district)
German-American Forty-Eighters
American editors
Writers from St. Louis
Publishers (people) of German-language newspapers in the United States